Jieyang Chaoshan International Airport  is an airport serving the cities of Jieyang, Shantou, Chaozhou and nearby areas in eastern Guangdong Province, China. It is located in the towns of Paotai and Denggang in Jiedong District, Jieyang, Guangdong. It was part of a relocation plan from the original Shantou Waisha Airport, and the site was chosen to be near the geographic center of Jieyang, Shantou, and Chaozhou. The airport was put into service on 15 December 2011, with the simultaneous shut-down of Shantou Waisha Airport as a commercial airport.

History
The city of Shantou was formerly served by Shantou Waisha Airport, a dual-use military and civil airport. Construction of Jieyang Chaoshan Airport began on 16 June 2009 with a total investment of 3.8 billion yuan. In November 2011, the Chinese Ministry of Environmental Protection halted the construction of the airport due to unauthorized deviations from the approved environmental impact report. The airport authorities submitted a revised environmental impact report, which gained approval from the ministry. Jieyang Chaoshan Airport was opened on 15 December 2011, when all civil flights were transferred from the old Waisha Airport, which remains in use as a military air base. On 10 July 2014, the Chinese government officially gave the airport international status, after having operated international flights for a number of years already. This allowed the airport to officially begin regular international flights in addition to those already operating.

Terminals

The whole terminal has an annual traffic capacity of 4.5 million passengers. A second check-in terminal has also been created outside Shantou Railway Station, with bus connections to the airport. The railway station serves two rail lines: the Xiashen line and the Meishan (Meizhou-Chaoshan) line, which

Airlines and destinations

Passenger

Cargo

Ground transportation
The airport is served by the adjacent Jieyang Airport railway station.

Statistics

Jieyang Chaoshan Airport is among the 50 busiest passenger airports in China.

See also
Shantou Waisha Airport
List of airports in China

References

External links

Airports in Guangdong
Jieyang
Transport in Shantou
Chaozhou
Airports established in 2011
2011 establishments in China